For the Summer Olympics, there are 38 venues that have been or will be used for shooting sports.

References

 
Venues
Shoot
Olympic venues